Ottone is an Italian name meaning "owner".

People with the given name
 Ottone di Bonvillano (fl. 1147–1153), Republic of Genoa citizen and colonial administrator
 Ottone Calderari (1730–1803), Italian architect
 Ottone del Carretto (fl. 1179–1237), Italian noble
 Ottone Enrico del Caretto, Marquis of Savona (1629–1685), Holy Roman Empire military commander and political figure
 Saint Ottone Frangipane (1040–1127), Benedictine monk and hermit
 Ottone Hamerani (1694–1768), Italian medallist
 Ottone Morena (fl. 12th century), Italian chronicler
 Ottone Olivieri (fl. 1917–1947), Italian-Yugoslav basketball player
 Ottone Rosai (1895–1957), Italian painter
 Ottone Visconti (1207–1295), archbishop of Milan

People with the surname
 Antonio Ottone (1941–2002), Argentine filmmaker
 Ernesto Ottone (born 1972), Chilean actor and cultural manager

See also
 Ottone (disambiguation)
 Oddone
 Otto

References

Italian-language surnames
Italian masculine given names